Nick Lyon (born April 25, 1970) is a Los Angeles-based film director and screenwriter. A native of Pocatello, Idaho, he spent 9 years in Germany where he attended the renowned Film Academy Baden-Württemberg in Ludwigsburg, Germany.

In Germany, Lyon went on to direct Academy Award winner Maximilian Schell in I Love You, Baby, a thriller produced by Warner Bros. Lyon has since directed numerous international films and award-winning independent films. Lyon is the winner of the DGA Directors Award at Moondance, for his independent film Punk Love. His credits include Grendel and Annihilation Earth for NBC/Universal, Species: The Awakening for MGM and North Sea for RTL Germany.

Filmography
 I Love You, Baby (2000)
 Punk Love (2006)
 Species: The Awakening (2007)
 Grendel (2007)
 Zombie Apocalypse (2011)
 Rise of the Zombies (2012)
 Bullet (2014)
Bermuda Tentacles (2014)
 Hercules Reborn (2014)
 They Found Hell (2015)
 In the Name of Ben-Hur (Changed to simply Ben-Hur for release) (2016)
 The Other Wife (2016)
 Operation Dunkirk (2017)
 D-Day (2019)
 The Rebels of PT-218 (2021)
 Titanic 666 (2022)

References

External links

Living people
People from Pocatello, Idaho
1970 births
Science fiction film directors
Film directors from Idaho
Screenwriters from Idaho